Noire et Blanche (French for Black and White) is a black and white photograph taken by American visual artist Man Ray in 1926. It is one of his most famous photographs at the time when he was an exponent of Surrealism.

History
The picture was first published in the Parisian Vogue magazine, on 1 May 1926, with the title Visage de Nacre et Masque d'Ébene. It would be published once again with the current title in the French magazines Variétés and Art et Décoration in 1928.

Man Ray had already published a similar photograph in the cover of the Dada magazine of Francis Picabia, with the title Black and White, in 1924, depicting two statuettes, one European and classical and the other African.

Description
The photograph depicts the famous French model Kiki de Montparnasse, expressionless, with her eyes closed and her head lying on a table, holding with her left hand a black African mask vertically upon the table. The picture juxtaposes the similarities between the soft oval white face of the model, as if she were a living mask, with the shiny black mask, also with eyes closed and a serene expression. It also expresses the artist's interest in African art, which had a huge influence in the artistic movements of the first decades of the 20th century.

Art market
A print of the photograph was sold by $3,131,533 at 8 November 2017, at Christie's, Paris.

Collections
There are prints of the photograph in several museums, including the Museum of Modern Art, in New York, and the Stedelijk Museum, in Amsterdam.

See also
 List of most expensive photographs

References

1920s photographs
1926 in art
Photographs by Man Ray
Black-and-white photographs
Photographs of the Museum of Modern Art (New York City)